Jean-Louis Benoît (born 22 January 1947 in Alès, Gard) is a French actor, screenwriter, theater and film director.

He is co-founder with Didier Bezace and Jacques Nichet of the theatre of l'Aquarium-Cartoucherie de Vincennes.

Filmography
As an actor :
 1981 : Une sale affaire by Alain Bonnot with Victor Lanoux and Marlène Jobert
 1983 : La Guerre des demoiselles by Jacques Nichet with Jean-Paul Roussillon
 1985 : Les Poings fermés with André Wilms
 1987 : Les Noces barbares by Marion Hänsel with Marianne Basler
 1992 : L.627 by Bertrand Tavernier with Didier Bezace

As a director :
 1985 : Les Poings fermés with André Wilms
 1989 : Dédé
 1997 : La Mort du Chinois with François Berléand, José Garcia and Isabelle Carré

As a writer :
 1998 : Que la lumière soit directed by Arthur Joffé

Theatre

External links
 Jean-Louis Benoît on IMDB.com 

1947 births
Living people
People from Alès
French theatre directors
French film directors
French male screenwriters
French screenwriters
French male film actors